is a Japanese professional footballer who plays as a defender for Boso Rover's Kisarazu.

References

External links

1996 births
Living people
Japanese footballers
Association football defenders
Giravanz Kitakyushu players
J3 League players